The 1991 Individual Long Track World Championship was the 21st edition of the FIM speedway Individual Long Track World Championship. The event was held on 28 July 1991 at Mariánské Lázně in the Czech Republic, which was Czechoslovakia at the time.

The Championship format returned to the 18 rider field format with 6 riders in each heat.

The world title was won by Gerd Riss of Germany.

Final Classification 

 E = eliminated (no further ride)
 f = fell
 ef = engine failure
 x = excluded

References 

1991
Speedway competitions in the Czech Republic
Sport in Czechoslovakia
Sports competitions in Czechoslovakia
Motor
Motor